Nuun Ujol Chaak also known as Shield Skull and Nun Bak Chak (born before 657-c.679CE), was an ajaw of the major Maya city of Tikal. He took the throne before 657 and reigned probably until his death.

Notes

Footnotes

References

Year of death unknown
Rulers of Tikal
7th century in the Maya civilization
7th-century monarchs in North America
Year of birth unknown